Sitaron Ko Choona Hai is a reality show that aired on Real TV and premiered on 9 March 2009.

The Faculty 

The Academy is headed by Raghu Ram who has also been involved in MTV Roadies. Accompanying Raghu are singer and performer, Neha Bhasin of the Viva fame and voice coach Prashant Samadhar.

 Raghu Ram
 Neha Bhasin - Neha is a trained classical singer, songwriter and dancer. Having won many awards for playback singing and live performances, Neha brings to the show her vast experience of grooming the contestants into attractive stage performers.
 Prashant A Samadhar
Contestants
 Yashraj Kapil - Yashraj Kapil is the winner of this show 
 Wajahat Hasan - Wajahat Hasan is Delhi Based Classical Singer.
 Sreeju Premarajan - Sreeju Premarajan is Delhi Based Singer who was also one of the Finalists of Indian Idol - Season 3.

References

Real (TV channel) original programming
2009 Indian television series debuts
2009 Indian television series endings
Indian television soap operas
Indian reality television series